Stuart Ian Duncan (born April 14, 1964) is an American bluegrass musician who plays the fiddle, mandolin, guitar, and banjo.

Life
Duncan was born in Quantico, Virginia, and raised in Santa Paula, California, where he played in the school band. He is married with three children.

Duncan has been a member of the Nashville Bluegrass Band since 1985. He also works as a session musician and has played with numerous well-known performers, including George Strait, Dolly Parton, Guy Clark, Reba McEntire, and Barbra Streisand. In 2006, he toured with the Mark Knopfler–Emmylou Harris Roadrunning tour, and he appears on their All the Roadrunning and Real Live Roadrunning albums. In 2008, he joined Robert Plant and Alison Krauss on the tour for their critically acclaimed album Raising Sand. He appeared on Transatlantic Sessions Series 4 broadcast by the BBC in September/October 2009.

In 2011, Duncan collaborated with cellist Yo-Yo Ma, bassist Edgar Meyer, mandolinist Chris Thile, and singer Aoife O'Donovan on the album The Goat Rodeo Sessions. The album debuted at number one on the Billboard Classical, Classical Crossover, and Bluegrass charts and reached number eighteen on the Billboard 200. It also won the Grammy Award for Best Folk Album and the Grammy Award for Best Engineered Album, Non-Classical in 2013.

In 2013, Duncan accompanied Diana Krall as a sideman on her Glad Rag Doll tour. In 2015 Duncan appeared on one of the tracks from the Jericho Summer album Night Train. Playing jazz on the violin, Duncan again toured with Diana Krall in 2018.

In 2020, Duncan once again collaborated with Ma, Meyer, Thile, and O'Donovan, releasing the album Not Our First Goat Rodeo. Like the group's previous album, reached number one on the Billboard Classical, Classical Crossover, and Bluegrass charts.

Awards
Duncan has received numerous awards. As a member of the Nashville Bluegrass Band, he won the Grammy Award for Best Bluegrass Album in 1994 and 1996. Duncan was named the Academy of Country Music Fiddle Player of the Year for 1996, 1998, 1999, 2001, and 2004, and Specialty Instrument Player of the Year for 2006.

References

American country fiddlers
American country singer-songwriters
1964 births
Living people
American bluegrass fiddlers
American bluegrass mandolinists
American country guitarists
American male guitarists
Singer-songwriters from California
People from Quantico, Virginia
People from Santa Paula, California
Grammy Award winners
Singer-songwriters from Virginia
Guitarists from California
Guitarists from Virginia
20th-century American guitarists
Country musicians from California
Country musicians from Virginia
20th-century American male musicians
Nashville Bluegrass Band members
American male singer-songwriters
Lyle Lovett and His Large Band members